Sabaot may refer to:

Sabaot people, a Kenyan sub-tribe
Sabaot language, a Kenyan language

Language and nationality disambiguation pages